Events in the year 1944 in China.

Incumbents 
President: Chiang Kai-shek
Premier: Chiang Kai-shek
Vice Premier: Kung Hsiang-hsi

Events 
April 17 – May 25 - Battle of Central Henan
May – August - Battle of Changsha (1944)
June 22 – August 8 - Defense of Hengyang
August 16 – November 24 - Battle of Guilin–Liuzhou

Births 
July - Liu Zemin
August - He Baowen
October - Huang Qingyi
October - Zhang Wenyue
December - Zheng Chengsi
December 21 - Zheng Xiaoyu

Deaths 
 Men Bingyue
 Lin Zongsu
March 5 - Benjamin Ralph Kimlau
May 21 - Li Jiayu
December 26 - Zhu Shenghao, translator